Attorney General Herbert may refer to:

Edward Herbert (attorney-general) (1590s–1658), Attorney General for England and Wales
Thomas J. Herbert (1894–1974), Attorney General of Ohio